Britt Peak is a small peak,  high, just southwest of the summit of Mount Moulton, in the Flood Range of Marie Byrd Land. It was mapped by the United States Geological Survey from surveys and from U.S. Navy air photos, 1959–66, and named by the Advisory Committee on Antarctic Names for Dale R. Britt, BU2, U.S. Navy, a builder who wintered-over at South Pole Station, 1969.

References
 

Mountains of Marie Byrd Land
Flood Range